Quitters is a 2015 American comedy film directed by Noah Pritzker and written by Noah Pritzker and Ben Tarnoff. The film stars Ben Konigsberg, Greg Germann, Mira Sorvino, Kara Hayward, Morgan Turner and Kieran Culkin. The film was released on July 22, 2016, by Momentum Pictures.

Cast
Ben Konigsberg as Clark Rayman
Greg Germann as Roger
Mira Sorvino as May Rayman
Kara Hayward as Etta
Morgan Turner as Natalia
Kieran Culkin as Mr. Becker 
Saffron Burrows as Veronica
Scott Lawrence as Todd
Jim Breuer		
Ross Turner as Bradley Friedlander
Katherine Liviakis as Shira
Carl Lumbly as Dr. Weiss
George Anagnostou as Steve

Release
The film premiered at South by Southwest on March 15, 2015. The film was released on July 22, 2016, by Momentum Pictures.

Reception

References

External links
 

2015 films
2015 comedy films
American comedy films
Films shot in New Jersey
2010s English-language films
2010s American films